Lars Walløe (born 20 May 1938)  is a Norwegian academic, chemist, physiologist, and scientific adviser to the Norwegian government. He was Head of Norwegian Delegation to the Scientific Committee of the International Whaling Commission (IWC); and he was honored by the government of Japan for having "Contributed to the promotion of Japan’s policy in the field of fisheries." From 2002 to 2008 Walløe served as the president of Academia Europaea.

Education
Walløe studied medicine at the University of Oslo; and has also earned a doctorate in physical chemistry:
In 1961, he was awarded a B.Sc.  In 1965, he earned his M.Sc. and M.D. In 1968, the university conferred his Ph.D.

Career
Walløe is Professor of Physiology at the Faculty of Medicine of the University of Oslo where he has previously also been professor of applied statistics and cybernetics. He has a Ph.D. degree in Physical chemistry.

He has also been part-time Research Director at the Norwegian Institute of Marine Research in Bergen, Norway.  He also was a part-time Professor at the Department of Arctic Biology at the University of Tromsø. His current research is in the field of cardiovascular control mechanisms in humans and in other large mammals, and he has developed non-invasive ultrasound instruments for such studies, but he has also published on neuronal nets, statistical methodology, historical demography, population biology, and reproductive epidemiology.

Professor Walløe is the scientific adviser to the Norwegian Government on Marine mammals. He has been President of the Norwegian Academy of Science and Letters, Chairman of the Norwegian Population Panel, Director of the Norwegian research program on acid rain, Chairman of the Norwegian Research Board for Environment and Development, and Chairman of the Standing Committee for Life and Environmental Sciences of the European Science Foundation.

Affiliations 
 Norwegian Academy of Science and Letters.
 Royal Norwegian Society of Science and Letters.
 Academia Europaea, Member (since 1999), President, 2008.
 Physiological Society (UK).
 Royal Statistical Society (UK).
 American Physiological Society (US).
 American Statistical Association (US).

Honors
  2005 – Royal Norwegian Order of St. Olav, Commander (Den Kongelige Norske St. Olavs Orden, Kommandør).
2009 – Order of the Rising Sun, Gold Rays with Neck Ribbon.

Notes

 Japanese Ministry of Foreign Affairs,  "2009 Autumn Conferment of Decorations on Foreign Nationals," p. 5.

1938 births
Living people
Norwegian physical chemists
Scientists from Oslo
Recipients of the Order of the Rising Sun
Academic staff of the University of Oslo
Members of Academia Europaea
Members of the Norwegian Academy of Science and Letters